Woodland High School is located in Dorchester, SC, it was established in 1999. Sixty-four percent of students passed the HSAP on the first try, compared to eighty-four percent in the neighboring district.  It was the high school of football star Tye Hill.

References

Public high schools in South Carolina
Schools in Dorchester County, South Carolina